Varakeh Rud (also Romanized as Varakeh Rūd, Varakah Rūd, Varaka Rood, Varakā Rūd, Varakrūd, Varkrūd, Warakāru, and Warakārūd) is a village in Dodangeh-ye Sofla Rural District, Ziaabad District, Takestan County, Qazvin Province, Iran. At the 2006 census, its population was 169, in 48 families.

References 

Populated places in Takestan County